The Bubble is a 2022 American comedy film directed by Judd Apatow from a screenplay co-written with Pam Brady. The film features an ensemble cast that includes Karen Gillan, Vir Das, Pedro Pascal,  Iris Apatow, Fred Armisen, Maria Bakalova, David Duchovny, Keegan-Michael Key, Leslie Mann, Kate McKinnon, Guz Khan, Peter Serafinowicz and Harry Trevaldwyn.

The Bubble was released on April 1, 2022, by Netflix. The film received negative reviews.

Plot
Following a problematic film role that nearly destroyed her career, actress Carol Cobb is offered the chance to revive it by reprising her role as the heroic Dr. Lacey Nightingale in the sixth installment of the wildly popular Cliff Beasts franchise: Cliff Beasts 6: Battle for Everest: Memories of a Requiem. Having turned down appearing in the fifth film in favor of doing the aforementioned panned role, Carol initially fears that her former Cliff Beasts castmates may still hold a grudge against her.

One of the first major film productions to resume amidst the COVID-19 pandemic, the Cliff Beasts cast arrive at a swanky English hotel and must self-quarantine for two weeks. Afterwards, a welcome back party is organized for the cast and crew. Here, Carol happily reunites with co-stars Dustin, Howie and Sean but has an awkward meeting with Lauren, the only Cliff Beasts co-star appearing bitter about her absence. There are two series newcomers, Dieter, a respected, but indifferent veteran actor, and Krystal, a young TikTok sensation to attract a younger demographic. The latter quickly bonds with Carla, a deadpan on-set production assistant who's her age. Director Darren Eigan, an enthusiastic, but frazzled indie filmmaker, tries to boost morale and make the shoot special, coming off as pretentious. He clashes with leading man Dustin, who constantly bombards him with revised versions of the script to fit his own vision. Dieter has a crush on Anika, the hotel's sweet front desk clerk, but she wants to build a proper relationship first before jumping into sex.

Shooting begins and for the first few days, everything appears to be okay. However, a series of events delay the production even more. During a group meditation session, Howie becomes paranoid and quits the film in a panic - in response to this, his Cliff Beasts character is killed off gruesomely. Bored in the hotel, Krystal and Carla sneak out to party in the city. This gains traction online and gets Krystal cancelled for her behavior, losing many of her followers. Later the cast tests positive for influenza, linked to a delivery girl who had given them all their morning coffees. Despite being ill, the studio forces them to film. Introduced is the mysterious Mr. Best, the head of a new security team from the studio to oversee the cast and film's production, making some of the cast grow suspicious. When the shoot starts back up again, Carol realizes that most of her character's dialogue and actions have either been given to Krystal or omitted entirely making her suspect this is how the studio is getting back at her for leaving the franchise. Carol has a heart-to-heart with Darren, telling him of her concerns, but when he talks to the higher-ups about giving back her dialogue it backfires.

Lauren tries to escape from the hotel in a frenzy one night. Mr. Best's men graphically shoot one of her hands off, leaving her in the hospital for the remainder of the shoot. Infuriated, Carol tries to rally together her castmates and fight for their rights. Shortly afterwards, while filming an elaborate dancing TikTok with Krystal, Dieter collapses. They quickly work together to revive him, however, it's Anika who does it, cementing their relationship. This event inspires the team, and they plan a getaway. As they shoot the climax, Dustin creates a distraction by clashing with Darren about the script revisions while the rest of the cast leave the set and try to avoid getting caught by Mr. Best and his men.

The cast meets up at the helipad, calling upon an unsure Sean to fly them out. A furious Darren tries to stop them from leaving, but is knocked out by Dustin. Inside the helicopter is Anika, who hopes to run away with Dieter, who happily accepts. Sean gets the helicopter up off the ground but doesn't know how to fly it forward. The rest of the crew encourage Sean to fly the helicopter away from the hotel as the Cliff Beasts cast celebrate their victory.

Two years later, a behind the scenes documentary detailing the troubled production and crazy antics on the set entitled Beasts of the Bubble is released to rave reviews and praise from the public. While Carol is described as "the villain" of the film, she's proud of the project. Dieter and Anika's relationship is still strong. Lauren is in good spirits, having a robotic hand. Meanwhile, Darren is signed on to direct a movie based on Skittles.

Cast
 Karen Gillan as Carol Cobb, a washed-up actress portraying Dr. Lacey Nightingale in the Cliff Beasts franchise.
 Vir Das as Ronjon, the owner of the hotel playing host to the Cliff Beasts 6 cast and crew.
 Pedro Pascal as Dieter Bravo, a serious veteran actor portraying a new character and tragic villain named Gio in Cliff Beasts 6 while coping with both an addiction to sex and hard drugs.
 Iris Apatow as Krystal Kris, a TikTok superstar who joins the Cliff Beasts 6 cast as the character Vivian Joy. An uncredited Maude Apatow also briefly portrays Kris in a parodic scene.
 Leslie Mann as Lauren Van Chance, an actress who portrays a Cliff Beasts fan favorite character named Dolly, as well as Dustin’s on-and-off love interest.
 Fred Armisen as Darren Eigan, a former indie filmmaker hired to direct Cliff Beasts 6.
 David Duchovny as Dustin Mulray, the workaholic lead of the Cliff Beasts franchise who portrays the character Dr. Hal Packard, as well as Lauren’s on-and-off love interest.
 Keegan-Michael Key as Sean Knox, an actor who portrays the Cliff Beasts character Colt Rockwell and promotes himself as a wellness guru when not on-camera.
 Kate McKinnon as Paula, the studio executive overseeing the Cliff Beasts franchise.
 Guz Khan as Howie Frangopolous, an actor who portrays Jarrar, the comic relief character of the Cliff Beasts franchise.
 Peter Serafinowicz as Gavin, executive producer of the Cliff Beasts franchise.
 Maria Bakalova as Anika, a hotel clerk propositioned by Dieter.
 Samson Kayo as Bola, the cast coordinator.
 Ross Lee as Mr. Best, the head of security.
 Harry Trevaldwyn as Gunther, the awkward COVID safety officer.
 Nick Kocher as Scott Dawson, the behind-the-scenes stills photographer.
 Daisy Ridley as Kate
 James McAvoy as himself

Production
It was announced in November 2020 that Judd Apatow had set his next film at Netflix, with the film being about the production of a film during the COVID-19 pandemic. The Bubble was written by Apatow and Pam Brady. It was inspired by the production of Jurassic World Dominion (2022), which was filmed during the pandemic with its actors living together in a hotel during the shoot.

In February 2021, Karen Gillan, Iris Apatow, Fred Armisen, Maria Bakalova, David Duchovny, Keegan-Michael Key, Leslie Mann, Pedro Pascal and Peter Serafinowicz were cast to star in the film. On March 16, 2021, Vir Das, Rob Delaney, Galen Hopper, Samson Kayo, Guz Khan, Nick Kocher, Ross Lee, Harry Trevaldwyn and Danielle Vitalis joined the cast.

Principal photography began on February 22, 2021, and concluded on April 16, 2021, in the United Kingdom at Shepperton Studios in Shepperton, Hedsor House in Hedsor and Cliveden House in Taplow.

Reception 
On Rotten Tomatoes, the film has an approval rating of 21% based on 115 reviews, with an average rating of 3.9/10. The website's critics consensus reads: "Meandering and mostly unfunny, The Bubble gums up an all-star cast with hackneyed gags about showbiz and pandemic life." Metacritic assigned the film a weighted average score of 34 out of 100 based on 34 critics, indicating "generally unfavorable reviews".

Apatow was nominated at the 43rd Golden Raspberry Awards for Worst Director, for his work on the film.

References

External links
 
 

2022 films
2022 comedy films
2020s English-language films
2020s parody films
American parody films
Apatow Productions films
English-language Netflix original films
Films about the COVID-19 pandemic
Films about dinosaurs
Films about filmmaking
Films directed by Judd Apatow
Films scored by Michael Andrews
Films set in England
Films set in hotels
Films set in the 2020s
Films shot at Shepperton Studios
Films shot in Buckinghamshire
Films with screenplays by Pam Brady
Self-reflexive films
2020s American films